The Eddie James Memorial Trophy is a Canadian Football League trophy, awarded to the leading rusher in the West Division.  Unlike other CFL trophies, there is no equivalent for the East Division.

The award is named after Eddie James, a former running back for the then Regina Roughriders in the 1930s.  In 1995, as part of the American expansion, the James trophy was awarded to the leading rusher in the North Division.

List of Eddie James Memorial Trophy winners
 2021 – Ka'Deem Carey, Calgary Stampeders (RB) - 869
 2020 – season cancelled - covid 19
 2019 – Andrew Harris (RB), Winnipeg Blue Bombers – 1,380
 2018 – Andrew Harris (RB), Winnipeg Blue Bombers – 1,390
 2017 – Andrew Harris (RB), Winnipeg Blue Bombers – 1,035
 2016 – Jerome Messam (RB), Calgary Stampeders – 1,198
 2015 – Andrew Harris (RB), BC Lions – 1,039
 2014 – Jon Cornish (RB), Calgary Stampeders – 1,082
 2013 – Jon Cornish (RB), Calgary Stampeders – 1,813
 2012 – Jon Cornish (RB), Calgary Stampeders – 1,457
 2011 – Jerome Messam (RB), Edmonton Eskimos – 1,057  
 2010 – Joffrey Reynolds (RB), Calgary Stampeders – 1,200
 2009 – Joffrey Reynolds (RB), Calgary Stampeders – 1,504
 2008 – Joffrey Reynolds (RB), Calgary Stampeders – 1,310
 2007 – Joe Smith (RB), BC Lions – 1,510
 2006 – Joffrey Reynolds (RB), Calgary Stampeders – 1,541
 2005 – Charles Roberts (RB), Winnipeg Blue Bombers – 1,624
 2004 – Charles Roberts (RB), Winnipeg Blue Bombers – 1,522
 2003 – Charles Roberts (RB), Winnipeg Blue Bombers – 1,554
 2002 – John Avery (RB), Edmonton Eskimos – 1,448
 2001 – Kelvin Anderson (RB), Calgary Stampeders – 1,383
 2000 – Kelvin Anderson (RB), Calgary Stampeders – 1,048
 1999 – Robert Drummond (RB), BC Lions – 1,309
 1998 – Kelvin Anderson (RB), Calgary Stampeders – 1,325
 1997 – Kelvin Anderson (RB), Calgary Stampeders – 1,088
 1996 – Robert Mimbs (RB), Saskatchewan Roughriders – 1,403
 1995 – Cory Philpot (RB), BC Lions – 1,308
 1994 – Cory Philpot (RB), BC Lions – 1,451
 1993 – Damon Allen (QB), Edmonton Eskimos – 920
 1992 – Jon Volpe (RB), BC Lions – 941
 1991 – Jon Volpe (RB), BC Lions – 1,395
 1990 – Tracy Ham (QB), Edmonton Eskimos – 1,096
 1989 – Reggie Taylor (RB), Edmonton Eskimos – 1,503
 1988 – Anthony Cherry (RB), BC Lions – 889
 1987 – Gary Allen (RB), Calgary Stampeders – 857
 1986 – Gary Allen (RB), Calgary Stampeders – 1,153
 1985 – Willard Reaves (RB), Winnipeg Blue Bombers – 1,323
 1984 – Willard Reaves (RB), Winnipeg Blue Bombers – 1,733
 1983 – Willard Reaves (RB), Winnipeg Blue Bombers – 898
 1982 – William Miller (RB), Winnipeg Blue Bombers – 1,076
 1981 – Jimmy Sykes (RB), Calgary Stampeders – 1,107
 1980 – Jimmy Sykes (RB), Calgary Stampeders – 1,263
 1979 – Jim Germany (RB), Edmonton Eskimos – 1,324
 1978 – Mike Strickland (RB), Saskatchewan Roughriders – 1,306
 1977 – Jim Washington (RB), Winnipeg Blue Bombers – 1,262
 1976 – Jim Washington (RB), Winnipeg Blue Bombers – 1,277
 1975 – Willie Burden (RB), Calgary Stampeders – 1,896
 1974 – George Reed (RB), Saskatchewan Roughriders – 1,447
 1973 – Roy Bell (RB), Edmonton Eskimos – 1,455
 1972 – Mack Herron (RB), Winnipeg Blue Bombers – 1,527
 1971 – Jim Evenson (RB), BC Lions – 1,237
 1970 – Hugh McKinnis (RB), Calgary Stampeders – 1,135
 1969 – George Reed (RB), Saskatchewan Roughriders – 1,353
 1968 – George Reed (RB), Saskatchewan Roughriders – 1,222
 1967 – George Reed (RB), Saskatchewan Roughriders – 1,471
 1966 – George Reed (RB), Saskatchewan Roughriders – 1,409
 1965 – George Reed (RB), Saskatchewan Roughriders – 1,768
 1964 – Lovell Coleman (RB), Calgary Stampeders – 1,629
 1963 – Lovell Coleman (RB), Calgary Stampeders – 1,343
 1962 – Nub Beamer (RB), BC Lions – 1,161
 1961 – Earl Lunsford (RB), Calgary Stampeders – 1,794
 1960 – Earl Lunsford (RB), Calgary Stampeders – 1,343
 1959 – Johnny Bright (RB), Edmonton Eskimos – 1,340
 1958 – Johnny Bright (RB), Edmonton Eskimos – 1,722
 1957 – Johnny Bright (RB), Edmonton Eskimos – 1,679
 1956 – Normie Kwong (RB), Edmonton Eskimos – 1,437
 1955 – Normie Kwong (RB), Edmonton Eskimos – 1,250
 1954 – Howard Waugh (RB), Calgary Stampeders – 1,043
 1953 – Billy Vessels (RB), Edmonton Eskimos – 926
 1952 – Johnny Bright (RB), Calgary Stampeders – 815
 1951 – Normie Kwong (RB), Edmonton Eskimos – 933
 1950 – Tom Casey (RB), Winnipeg Blue Bombers – 637

Canadian Football League trophies and awards